The Bebra–Fulda railway is a continuously double track and electrified main line.

Its construction commenced as part of the Bebra–Hanau Railway or Kurhessen State Railway. After the Prussian annexation of the Electorate of Hesse (Kurhessen) as a result of the Austro-Prussian War of 1866, it was completed to Frankfurt as the Frankfurt-Bebra Railway.

During the division of Germany, it was part of the North–South railway, the busiest and most important connection of the former Deutsche Bundesbahn between north and south Germany.

History

The construction of the track began in Bebra station on Hesse-Kassel's line to Gerstungen. On 22 January 1866, the first section was completed to Bad Hersfeld. The opening of the second section via Hünfeld to Fulda station followed later that year on 1 October 1866.

Route 
At first the line follows the valley of the Fulda from Bebra. In Bad Hersfeld, the line swings into the valley of the Haun. This alignment was chosen in order to run through Kurhessen territory, since at the time of construction of the line, part of the valley of the Fulda belonged to the Grand Duchy of Hesse. As a result, the line has to be climb the ridge between the two river valleys on its way to Fulda.

Crossings 
For an important national line, it has an unusual density of level crossings with a total of eight crossings. North of Bad Hersfeld, there are two crossings (Reilos and Friedlos). Both have been converted to automatic systems (Einheits-Bahnübergangstechnik, EBÜT) systems. The other crossings south of Bad Hersfeld are all still manned.
Reilos (EBÜT system)
 Friedlos, Mülldeponie (EBÜT system)
a barrier between Bad Hersfeld and Unterhaun (requiring a call)
Unterhaun
Oberhaun station (electric full barriers)
L3471/B27 at Haunetal Wehrda
Hünfeld Breitzbacher Weg and Haunstraße (both mechanical and bound by the interlocking)

Operations 
Until the Second World War, the line was used mainly for Frankfurt–Leipzig traffic. This route lost its significance after the division of German. Only the transit trains from West Germany to West Berlin and the inter-zonal trains between West and East Germany ran over long distances on this route. Since a change of locomotives was required at Bebra, the Berlin curve near Bebra station, which avoided the station and a reversal there, was shut down. There was considerable traffic between Frankfurt and Hanover and the connection between Bavaria in the south and the Fulda–Main railway became more and more important. Bebra–Fulda became a part of the North–South railway of Deutsche Bundesbahn. In 1963, the line was electrified.

The fall of the Inner German border in 1989 and the opening of the Hanover–Würzburg high-speed railway in 1991 changed the situation again. The opening of the border meant that Intercity trains again ran on the Fulda–Bebra route, while the opening of the high-speed line meant that almost all long-distance services between Hanover and Frankfurt am Main and Würzburg were abruptly lost. Since the 2007 timetable, the Bebra–Fulda railway has been served hourly by an Intercity-Express line on the Dresden–Leipzig–Eisenach–Erfurt–Frankfurt route (stopping  every two hours in Bad Hersfeld). There are some additional Intercity services on the line during the day. But the line is mainly operated by freight trains. There are also night train services.

Local services have been operated since 10 December 2006 by Cantus Verkehrsgesellschaft. The two lines, Fulda–Kassel and Fulda–Göttingen, each run every two-hours, operating hourly on the common route between Fulda and Bebra. Two pairs of Regional-Express services are operated by DB Regio in the peak hours between Frankfurt and Bebra and return.

In freight transport, the line is still part of the north-south axis and there is still heavy traffic.

Gallery

Notes

Railway lines in Hesse
Standard gauge railways in Germany
Railway lines opened in 1866